Estonia competed at the 2016 Winter Youth Olympics in Lillehammer, Norway from 12 to 21 February 2016.

Alpine skiing

Girls

Biathlon

Boys

Girls

Mixed

Cross-country skiing

Boys

Girls

Curling

Mixed team

Team
Jarl Gustsin
Kristin Laidsalu
Eiko-Siim Peips
Britta Sillaots

Round Robin

Draw 1

Draw 2

Draw 3

Draw 4

Draw 5

Draw 6

Draw 7

Mixed doubles

Figure skating

Couples

Nordic combined

Ski jumping

Speed skating

Boys

Mixed team sprint

See also
Estonia at the 2016 Summer Olympics

References

Lillehammeris toimuvatel II Noorte Taliolümpiamängudel osaleb Eestist 17 noorsportlast Estonian Ski Association

2016 in Estonian sport
Nations at the 2016 Winter Youth Olympics
Estonia at the Youth Olympics